Mariano Pasini (born 19 October 1979 in Buenos Aires, Argentina) is a retired Argentine footballer who played as a midfielder.

Teams
  Vélez Sársfield 1997
  All Boys 1997–1999
  Lobos BUAP 2000
  Santiago Wanderers 2000
  Racing de Montevideo 2001
  Estudiantes de Buenos Aires 2001–2002
  All Boys 2002–2003
  Atlanta 2003–2004
  Fortuna Düsseldorf 2004–2005
  Temperley 2005–2006
  Tigre 2006–2010
  Deportivo Laferrere 2010–2011

References
 Profile at BDFA 
 

Argentine footballers
Argentine expatriate footballers
Club Atlético Tigre footballers
Estudiantes de Buenos Aires footballers
All Boys footballers
Club Atlético Atlanta footballers
Club Atlético Vélez Sarsfield footballers
Racing Club de Montevideo players
Santiago Wanderers footballers
Expatriate footballers in Chile
Expatriate footballers in Mexico
Expatriate footballers in Uruguay
Expatriate footballers in Germany
1979 births
Living people
German footballers needing infoboxes
Association football midfielders
Footballers from Buenos Aires